Al Nasr Lel Taa'den Sporting Club, is an Egyptian sports club based in Edfu, Aswan, Egypt.

The club promoted for the first time in its history to the Egyptian Premier League during the 2015–16 season of the Egyptian Second Division, after winning the promotion play-off match against Al Assiouty Sport.

Current squad

References

Football clubs in Egypt
Sports clubs in Egypt